Aksyonovo, listed as Aksenovo, is a railway station in Alsheyevsky District, Bashkortostan, Russia.

References 

Railway stations in Bashkortostan